"I'm Not Here to Make Friends" is a song by English singer-songwriter Sam Smith. It was released on 27 January 2023 by Capitol Records as the fourth single from Smith's 2023 studio album, Gloria. The song was produced by Calvin Harris, StarGate, Jimmy Napes and Smith, and features vocals by RuPaul and Jessie Reyez. Smith previously collaborated with Harris and Reyez on "Promises" in 2018.

Background
Sam Smith announced through a social media post their fourth studio album Gloria, attached with the official cover art, on 17 October 2022 after the release of the album's lead single "Unholy".

The track was announced on 30 November 2022, via a clip on Smith's official social media platforms. In the clip, Smith is mouthing the lyrics to the song while clothed in a pashmina dress, but is slowly revealed to be solely wearing fishnets over underwear with exposed thighs.

Critical reception
The track received mixed to positive reviews from critics. Jamieson Cox of Pitchfork described the song as "a whirlwind of grown-up lust that evokes George Michael... circa 'Fastlove' and 'Outside.'" Lindsay Zoladz of The New York Times describes the song as "sleek, glittery... [and] taps into the pop-disco revival ignited by artists like Dua Lipa and Jessie Ware, taking its shout-along hook from a common reality show refrain."

Alexis Petridis of The Guardian refers to the track as one of the highlights of Gloria, describing it as a "disco-fied" track about "finding a one-night stand on the dancefloor." Petridis later states that "elsewhere, their voice proves a problem. If you sing about loving yourself or flirtation in the same disconsolate tone that you sing about being abandoned by your recent ex-partner... it’s going to have a levelling effect, making the material seem less varied."

Music video
A music video for "I'm Not Here to Make Friends" was released on 27 January 2023. It was directed by Tanu Muino. The video for I'm Not Here to Make Friends starts with Sam, wearing an enormous pink coat, arriving at a remote castle by helicopter. Once inside, dancers and drag queens surround the singer for a series of routines. It received controversy online due to its suggestive nature.

Charts

Weekly charts

Monthly charts

Release history

References

2023 singles
2023 songs
Music video controversies
Sam Smith (singer) songs
Song recordings produced by Stargate (record producers)
Songs written by Sam Smith (singer)
Songs written by Jimmy Napes
Songs written by Mikkel Storleer Eriksen
Songs written by Tor Erik Hermansen
Capitol Records singles
Music videos directed by Tanu Muino